Barry Smith (born 8 March 1940) is an Australian former professional Grand Prix motorcycle road racer.


Motorcycle racing career
Smith was born in Macclesfield, England where he bought his first motorcycle, a 250cc BSA. By 1959, his family had emigrated to Australia and Smith began motorcycle racing against Australian riders such as Kel Carruthers and Tom Phillis.

The need for more competition led Smith back to Europe where he competed in the Grand Prix world championships from 1963 to 1981. His best seasons were in 1968 and 1969 when he finished third in the 50cc world championship. He also won the 1968 Isle of Man 50cc Ultra-Lightweight TT, achieving the first Grand Prix win for Spanish manufacturer Derbi.

Smith won three consecutive victories in the Formula III Class at the Isle of Man TT from 1979 to 1981. He also won the 1979 and 1981 Formula III Class in the Formula TT world championship. Smith also won the 125 Australian national championships in 1978 and 1981. He retired in 1983 after 25 years of competitive racing. Smith won four Grand Prix races during his career.

References

External links
 Book Review: Whispering Smith: Barry Smith World Champion

 

1940 births
Living people
Sportspeople from Macclesfield
Australian motorcycle racers
50cc World Championship riders
125cc World Championship riders
250cc World Championship riders
350cc World Championship riders
Isle of Man TT riders
English emigrants to Australia